Berlin to the Samba Beat (Portuguese:Berlim na Batucada) is a 1944 Brazilian musical comedy film directed by Luiz de Barros. The film was in the popular tradition of chanchadas, featuring stars of the musical stage. It was made by the Rio de Janeiro-based Cinédia studio. It was a follow-up to the hit Samba in Berlin (1944) which made fun of Brazil's World War II enemy Nazi Germany.

Cast
 Procópio Ferreira as Zé Carioca 
 Francisco Alves as Chico 
 Solange França as Odete 
 Alfredo Viviani as Pacheco 
 Lyson Caster as Mrs.Pacheco 
 Delorges Caminha
 Chocolate
 Léo Albano
 Alvarenga
 Carlos Barbosa
 Linda Batista
 Jupira Brasil
 Luizinha Carvalho
 Olivinha Carvalho 
 Nilo Chagas  
 Matilde Costa  
 Walter D'Ávila  
 Edu da Gaita  
 Ivo de Freitas   
 Dalva de Oliveira
 Lila de Oliveira   
 Margarida de Oliveira    
 Pedro Dias   
 Heitor dos Prazeres  
 Claudionor dos Santos    
 Otávio França
 Viviane Gaster
 Adhemar Gonzaga    
 Henricão    
 Jararaca  
 Maurício Lanthos   
Príncipe Maluco  
 Vicente Marchelli  
 Herivelto Martins
 Flora Matos   
 Silvino Neto  
 Nilo Oliveira  
 Grande Otelo   
 Ranchinho   
 Ratinho 
 Pery Ribeiro
 Manoel Rocha 
 Fada Santoro 
 Nair Santos 
 Grijo Sobrinho

References

Bibliography
 Shaw, Lisa & Dennison, Stephanie. Brazilian National Cinema. Routledge, 2014.

External links
 

1944 musical comedy films
1944 films
Brazilian musical comedy films
Brazilian black-and-white films
Films set in Berlin
1940s Portuguese-language films
Films directed by Luiz de Barros
Cinédia films